The British Virgin Islands national basketball team represents the British Virgin Islands (BVI) in international basketball competitions. It is administrated by the British Virgin Islands Amateur Basketball Federation.

Despite their very small population size, the BVI are one of the top contenders at the Caribbean Basketball Championship as they finished in the top four at the last four competitions. Their best result was runner-up at the 2009 edition.

Competitions

FIBA AmeriCup
yet to qualify

Centrobasket
2010 : 8th

Caribbean Championship

Commonwealth Games

never participated

Roster
Team for the 2015 FIBA CBC Championship.

See also
British Virgin Islands women's national basketball team
British Virgin Islands national under-19 basketball team
British Virgin Islands national under-17 basketball team
British Virgin Islands national 3x3 team

References

External links
Presentation at CaribbeanBasketball.com
Latinbasket.com - British Virgin Islands Men National Team
British Virgin Islands Basketball Records at FIBA Archive

Videos
 British Virgin Islands v Guayana - Group B - 2014 CBC Championship Youtube.com video

Men's national basketball teams
Basketball in the British Virgin Islands
1979 establishments in the British Virgin Islands
Basketball
Basketball teams in the British Virgin Islands
Sports teams in the British Virgin Islands